Moment in Peking is a 1988 Taiwanese TV series produced by Chinese Television System, based on Lin Yutang's 1939 English-language novel of the same name, set in Peking (Beijing) in the first half of the 20th century.

Cast
Angie Chiu as Yao Mulan
Ouyang Lung as Tseng Sunya
Lin Tzay-peir as Kung Lifu
Chao Chia-jung as Yao Mochow 
Fu Lei as Yao Sze-an
Wu Ching-hsien as Mrs. Yao
Lee Lee-feng as Cassia
Wen Shuai as Tseng Chinya
Tseng Ya-chun as Sun Manni
Chang Feng as Mr. Tseng

Awards and nominations
1989 Golden Bell AwardsWon—Best Television SeriesWon'''—Best Actress (Lee Lee-feng)

1988 Taiwanese television series debuts
1988 Taiwanese television series endings
Chinese Television System original programming
Mandarin-language television shows
Television shows based on Chinese novels